Demons is an album by the Canadian alt-country band Cowboy Junkies, released in 2011. It contains eleven Vic Chesnutt covers. It is Volume Two of the Nomad Series.

Album development 
Vic Chesnutt died at age 45 on December 25, 2009, and Demons is the Junkies tribute album to him. The band had previously shown their respect for Chesnutt by including him in their twentieth anniversary celebration of The Trinity Session when they redid the album as Trinity Revisited, which included Chesnutt as one of the musicians, including taking the lead on one song, "Postcard Blues". He had also previously toured with the Cowboy Junkies several times, starting with the tour supporting Lay It Down. Michael Timmins stated about this album "One of the hopes of this album is that it inspires people to seek out the originals and keep his music alive. We had intended to do an album where he would write the songs, and we would be the band. Now we're trying to fulfill a bit of that desire." Chesnutt and the Junkies were planning on doing a collaborative album together, but Chesnutt died shortly before they could start recording. The Junkies then mined his previous work to showcase Chesnutt's personal demons that he laid out in his very honest song writing. The album may also be exorcising some of the Cowboy Junkies' demons as well. The Junkies turn an album born out of the death of their friend into an assertion of life. According to Michael Timmins, they approached the recording of the album with the same spirit that they felt Vic Chesnutt approached his. They let accidents happen, investing the "songs with the same spirit and the adventure with which they were written, at the same time investing them with our own Northern spin". Fifteen years earlier, the band had tried to cover one of Chestnutt's song, "West of Rome", but scrapped the project when they could not capture the sound they needed to give the song what it required. After Chestnutt's death, in the middle of their Nomad project, the Junkies were kicking around ideas of cover songs, and it occurred to them that Chestnutt was who they wanted to cover. The band did not want to just recreate Chestnutt's songs, but bring something to them. Margo got deep into the songs and figured out how to represent Chestnutt's voice. Michael Timmins believes that having fifteen more years to mature and gain insight allowed the band to grasp Chestnutt's work.

Track listing

Personnel 
Cowboy Junkies
Margo Timmins – vocals
Michael Timmins – guitar, backing vocals
Alan Anton – bass
Peter Timmins – drums, percussion

Additional musicians
Jeff Bird – mandolin
Joby Baker – organ, piano, Wurlitzer, horn arrangement
Aaron Goldstein - guitar
Tania Elizabeth – fiddle
Dave Henry - cello
Henry Kucharzyk - woodwind arrangement
Alfons Fear, Nick Lariviere, Roy Styffe - horn
Bob Stevenson - clarinet
Andy Maize - backing vocals

Production
Michael Timmins – producer, engineer, mixed by
Peter J. Moore – mastered at the E Room
Peter Timmins - assistant
Joby Baker – engineer, mixing
Dave Henry - engineer
Alice Phieu – graphics design
Enrique Martinez Celaya – cover image

References

External links 

2011 albums
Cowboy Junkies albums
Covers albums
Latent Recordings albums